The Nette is a small river in Rhineland-Palatinate, Germany, a left tributary of the Rhine. It rises in the Eifel, south of Nürburg. The Nette flows east through Mayen before reaching the Rhine between Weißenthurm and Andernach.

The Nette is not navigable and has otherwise no strategical importance. It is used in Mayen, among other things, as a supply of the local paper industry. It gives its name to the beer Nette Edel Pils, originally brewed in Weißenthurm (but now brewed in Koblenz by the Koblenzer Brauerei), and the Clinic Nette-Gut of Forensic Psychiatry at Weißenthurm.

See also 
List of rivers of Rhineland-Palatinate

Rivers of Rhineland-Palatinate
Rivers of the Eifel
Rivers of Germany